This is a list of films produced by the American film industry from the earliest films of the 1890s to the present. Films are listed by year of release on separate pages, either in alphabetical order (1900–2013) or in chronological order (2014– ).

1890s
List of American films of the 1890s

1900s
 List of American films of 1900
 List of American films of 1901
 List of American films of 1902
 List of American films of 1903
 List of American films of 1904
 List of American films of 1905
 List of American films of 1906
 List of American films of 1907
 List of American films of 1908
 List of American films of 1909

1910s
 List of American films of 1910
 List of American films of 1911
 List of American films of 1912
 List of American films of 1913
 List of American films of 1914
 List of American films of 1915
 List of American films of 1916
 List of American films of 1917
 List of American films of 1918
 List of American films of 1919

1920s
 List of American films of 1920
 List of American films of 1921
 List of American films of 1922
 List of American films of 1923
 List of American films of 1924
 List of American films of 1925
 List of American films of 1926
 List of American films of 1927
 List of American films of 1928
 List of American films of 1929

1930s
 List of American films of 1930
 List of American films of 1931
 List of American films of 1932
 List of American films of 1933
 List of American films of 1934
 List of American films of 1935
 List of American films of 1936
 List of American films of 1937
 List of American films of 1938
 List of American films of 1939

1940s
 List of American films of 1940
 List of American films of 1941
 List of American films of 1942
 List of American films of 1943
 List of American films of 1944
 List of American films of 1945
 List of American films of 1946
 List of American films of 1947
 List of American films of 1948
 List of American films of 1949

1950s
 List of American films of 1950
 List of American films of 1951
 List of American films of 1952
 List of American films of 1953
 List of American films of 1954
 List of American films of 1955
 List of American films of 1956
 List of American films of 1957
 List of American films of 1958
 List of American films of 1959

1960s
 List of American films of 1960
 List of American films of 1961
 List of American films of 1962
 List of American films of 1963
 List of American films of 1964
 List of American films of 1965
 List of American films of 1966
 List of American films of 1967
 List of American films of 1968
 List of American films of 1969

1970s
 List of American films of 1970
 List of American films of 1971
 List of American films of 1972
 List of American films of 1973
 List of American films of 1974
 List of American films of 1975
 List of American films of 1976
 List of American films of 1977
 List of American films of 1978
 List of American films of 1979

1980s

 List of American films of 1980
 List of American films of 1981
 List of American films of 1982
 List of American films of 1983
 List of American films of 1984
 List of American films of 1985
 List of American films of 1986
 List of American films of 1987
 List of American films of 1988
 List of American films of 1989

1990s
 List of American films of 1990
 List of American films of 1991 
 List of American films of 1992 
 List of American films of 1993
 List of American films of 1994
 List of American films of 1995
 List of American films of 1996
 List of American films of 1997 
 List of American films of 1998
 List of American films of 1999

2000s
 List of American films of 2000
 List of American films of 2001
 List of American films of 2002
 List of American films of 2003
 List of American films of 2004
 List of American films of 2005
 List of American films of 2006
 List of American films of 2007
 List of American films of 2008
 List of American films of 2009

2010s
 List of American films of 2010
 List of American films of 2011
 List of American films of 2012
 List of American films of 2013
 List of American films of 2014
 List of American films of 2015
 List of American films of 2016
 List of American films of 2017
 List of American films of 2018
 List of American films of 2019

2020s
 List of American films of 2020
 List of American films of 2021
 List of American films of 2022
 List of American films of 2023
 List of American films of 2024
 List of American films of 2025
 List of American films of 2026
 List of American films of 2027
 List of American films of 2028
 List of American films of 2029

See also
:Category:American film awards
Classical Hollywood cinema

External links
 American film at the Internet Movie Database
 "The 100 Greatest American Films", BBC.com